Pro Cinema is a Romanian movie channel that launched on April 19, 2004. It is owned by Central European Media Enterprises. It was the first Romanian TV channel dedicated exclusively to movies, and as such it attracted a significant audience from its very inception, mainly in the 21-54 urban demographic. Contrary to most indigenous channels, Pro Cinema aired a wide array of movies, ranging from Romanian and international classics to recent American blockbusters. The channel introduced popular contemporary series such as The Sopranos, Monk, Alarm für Cobra 11, Two and a Half Men or The Shield, but also aired older sitcoms such as Seinfeld (currently aired by Pro X) and Friends, which were formerly broadcast by Pro TV. PRO Cinema also aired shows such as Saturday Night Live and various documentaries featuring famous actors and directors.

From January 2015, Pro Cinema broadcasts only movies, while the series and the documentaries were moved to other sister channels (mostly, they were moved to Acasă Gold).

References

Logos

External links
Official website

Central European Media Enterprises
Cinema
Television channels and stations established in 2004
Movie channels in Romania
Television stations in Romania